Honeysuckle Dog is an album by Chris Smither originally recorded in 1973 for United Artists Records but released in 2005.  The album was not released until 2005 because the record label was purchased by Transamerica, which culled over half the UA roster of artists (including Smither) shortly before putting the label out of business altogether.  Despite being dropped from the record label, Smither continued to tour, becoming a fixture in the New England folk clubs.

He would re-record a number of the songs for later albums on other labels.

Track listing
All tracks composed by Chris Smither; except where indicated
 "Sunshine Lady" (Paul MacNeil)
 "Tribute to Mississippi John Hurt" (Hurt)
 "Honeysuckle Dog" 
 "Rattlesnake Preacher" (Eric Von Schmidt)
 "Rosalie" 
 "Guilty" (Randy Newman)
 "It Ain't Easy" (Ron Davies)
 "Lonely Time" 
 "Homunculus" 
 "Braden River" 
 "Steel Guitar" (Danny O'Keefe)
 "Jailhouse Blues" (Traditional)

Personnel
Chris Smither – vocals, guitar
Eric Kaz - piano, harmonica
Dr. John - piano
Lowell George - guitar
David Holland - bass
Patti Austin - background vocals
Hilda Harris - background vocals
Maretha Stewart - background vocals
Robin Kenyatta - flute
Jackie Lomax - bass
Ray Lucas - drums
Bill Payne - piano
Pat Rebillot - piano, organ
Perry Robinson - clarinet
Mike Mainieri - vibraphone
Chris Parker - drums
Richard Anthony Davis - bass

Production
Produced by Michael Cuscuna
Engineered by Mark Harmon, Nick Jameson, Harry Maslin

References

1973 albums
Chris Smither albums
Albums produced by Michael Cuscuna